Riccarton High School is a state co-educational secondary school located in Upper Riccarton, a suburb of  Christchurch, New Zealand. With a roll of  students, it is one of the five largest secondary schools in Christchurch.

History
The Government purchased the  site for the school in September 1954. The site had previously been proposed for a textile mill, but was sold after the owner abandoned its proposal.

In January 1956, the Christchurch Post-primary Schools' Council agreed to establish a high school in western Christchurch. The council originally decided to develop Burnside High School first; the Riccarton site was disfavoured due to proximity to an industrial area, the Wigram Aerodrome and main arterial roads. A deputation of eight primary schools, Wharenui, Ilam, Riccarton, Sockburn, Hornby, Yaldhurst, Templeton and West Melton, urged the council to reconsider its decision and develop the Riccarton site first. On 1 May 1956, the council agreed to develop Riccarton High School ahead of Burnside High School.

The school opened on 4 February 1958 with an initial roll of 140 students. The school's roll increased over time, reaching its height in 1974 when it had some 1,149 pupils on its books. With the opening of Hornby High School in 1976, Riccarton's roll began to drop. The lowest roll since 1974 was in 1986 when the school had dropped to just 612 pupils. Since then, the school has increased its numbers, stabilising at about 950 pupils a year.

Academics
As a state school, Riccarton High School follows the New Zealand Curriculum (NZC). In Years 11 to 13, students complete the National Certificate of Educational Achievement (NCEA), the main secondary school qualification in New Zealand.

Sport, music and culture
Each year the school engages in a Winter and Summer sports exchange with Kaikorai Valley College from Dunedin, with the most successful school taking home the respective shield. 
Some 40 clubs, sports, music and cultural groups are currently on offer.

Riccarton High School has two sister schools in Japan. They are Takefu Higashi High School senior school in the Fukui Prefecture and Sakai Machi in Gunma Prefecture.

Facilities
Riccarton High School is primarily constructed in the late-1950s "Nelson Single Storey" design, characterised by single-storey classroom blocks with six classrooms arranged in an H shape and toilet and cloakrooms on one side. Riccarton has three of these blocks: B, S and T blocks. The school also has two 1960s "Nelson 2H" blocks, E/F and G/H, which are two-storey versions of the Nelson Single Storey blocks.

In 2004 the school entered into a "partnership" with the Christchurch City Council to build a large school/community joint-use library and cafe at the school.

References

External links
 Riccarton High School's official website
Education Review Office (ERO) report for 2018
 New Zealand Educated - Riccarton High School
 NZQA Provider Details - Riccarton High School

Educational institutions established in 1958
Secondary schools in Christchurch
1958 establishments in New Zealand